The Basin worm snake (Amerotyphlops minuisquamus) is a species of snake in the Typhlopidae family. It has been reported in Colombia, Peru, Brazil (Amazonas) and Guyana.

References

minuisquamus
Snakes of South America
Reptiles of Colombia
Reptiles of Guyana
Reptiles of Peru
Reptiles of Brazil
Reptiles described in 1979